This Christmas is the first holiday album released by American singer Patti LaBelle. It was released by MCA Records on October 30, 1990, in the United States. The album was released while LaBelle was working on a follow-up to her previous album, Be Yourself (1989). It included original compositions such as "'Twas Love", which LaBelle shot a video for, and "Nothing Could Be Better", which was sung live by LaBelle during an appearance on the television show, A Different World. This Christmas would be re-released in 1995 with all new artwork and a new bonus track, "Angel Man". The 1995 re-release was later reissued in 2004 under the 20th Century Masters: The Christmas Collection line, labeled The Best of Patti LaBelle.

Critical reception

Allmusic editor Jose F. Promis called This Christmas a "likeable collection of easygoing holiday confections. The songs prove quite endearing, but in some cases are marred by somewhat dated production [...] Oftentimes, holiday albums such as this – composed of new, untraditional recordings – are somewhat tepid, but that's thankfully not the case here. Despite a few dull moments and some lackluster production, this is quite an enjoyable and endearing holiday set, and will no doubt please the legendary singer's many fans."

Track listing

Notes
  denotes associate producer
  denotes co-producer

Charts

References

1990 Christmas albums
Patti LaBelle albums
Albums produced by Kenneth Gamble
Albums produced by Leon Huff
MCA Records albums
Christmas albums by American artists
Contemporary R&B Christmas albums
Pop Christmas albums